La Harpe may refer to:

 La Harpe (surname)
 La Harpe, Illinois
 La Harpe, Kansas

See also
 Harpe (disambiguation)